Geyser FC is a football (soccer) club from Chad based in N'Djamena.

In 2011 the team has played in Chad Premier League.

Stadium
The club plays home matches on Stade Omnisports Idriss Mahamat Ouya.

Kits
The team plays in blue and orange kits.

League participations
Chad Premier League : 2011–2013Chad Second Division : 2013–

References

External links
Soccerway
Geyser Fc GIF

Football clubs in Chad
N'Djamena